The Philadelphia Whiskey Festival is annual festival held in November, and it is sponsored by the Pennsylvania Liquor Control Board and Philadelphia Magazine.  Over sixty distilled spirits producers present a wide variety of spirits for tasting, including: whiskey, Canadian and Irish whiskies, Bourbon, Scotch, single malts, tequila, rum, gin, vodka and cognac.

The festival includes a buffet as well as a raffle to benefit The Philadelphia Committee to End Homelessness.

See also
American Whiskey Trail
Pittsburgh Whiskey & Fine Spirits Festival

External links
Philadelphia Whiskey Festival

Festivals in Philadelphia